Catherine Sullivan (born 1968) born in Los Angeles, California is an associate professor in the Department of Visual Arts at the University of Chicago, and a Chicago-based artist whose work combines video and performance.

She was educated at the California Institute of Arts and the Art Center College of Design. She is a former actor, and studied as a graduate student under Mike Kelley. She currently teaches at the University of Chicago.

Triangle of Need was a multi-channel video instillation at the Walker Art Center, on view from August 23-November 18, 2007. This project was a collaboration with Sean Griffin, Dylan Skybrook, and Kunle Afolayan.

Five Economies (big hunt/little hunt) (2002) restages scenes from films including The Miracle Worker, Marat/Sade, Persona and Whatever Happened to Baby Jane?. 'Tis Pity She's a Fluxus Whore (2003) combines filmed re-enactments of a 1953 production of John Ford's play and a 1964 Fluxus performance. Her works D-Pattern and The Chittendens were made in collaboration with the composer Sean Griffin.

She won an Alpert award in 2004 and her works are held in the collections of the Whitney Museum of American Art, the Tate and the Miami Art Museum. Sullivan has been featured on Art 21.

References

https://www.nytimes.com/2005/12/09/arts/art-in-review-catherine-sullivan.html

External links
Richard Dorment, telegraph.co.uk, Oct 30, 2007.
Catherine Sullivan's page at Galerie Catherine Bastide
2008 Bomb Magazine discussion with Catherine Sullivan & Meg Stuart
Walker Art Center

American contemporary artists
1968 births
Living people